The 2005–06 Sporting de Gijón season was the eighth consecutive season of the club in Segunda División after its last relegation from La Liga.

Overview
Real Sporting finished the season in the ninth position, repeating the performance of the previous season in League and Cup.

On 7 January 2006, the match against Racing de Ferrol, played in A Malata, became the first broadcasting ever of Radio Televisión del Principado de Asturias, the new regional public television of Asturias.

Squad

From the youth squad

Competitions

Segunda División

Results by round

League table

Matches

Copa del Rey

Matches

Squad statistics

Appearances and goals

|}

References

External links
Profile at BDFutbol
Official website

Sporting de Gijón seasons
Sporting de Gijon